The El Raton Theater, at 115 N. Second St. in Raton, New Mexico, is a theatre built in 1930.  It was listed on the National Register of Historic Places in 2007.

It was designed by architect George H. Williamson with elements of Late Gothic Revival style that suggest a Late Gothic Revival-style castle.  It is a two-story brick building with a crenellated parapet and small towers.

References

External links

Theatres in New Mexico
National Register of Historic Places in Colfax County, New Mexico
Gothic Revival architecture in New Mexico
Buildings and structures completed in 1930